Brendon Burns may refer to:

Brendon Burns (comedian) (born 1971), Australian comedian
Brendon Burns (politician), New Zealand politician